Nightwatch is an American reality television series broadcast by A&E. The show follows the night-shift emergency service workers of a specific city as they perform their duties. The series is filmed in New Orleans, except for Season 4, which was filmed in Tampa.

List of episodes

Season 1 (2015)

Season 2 (2015–16)

Season 3 (2016–17)

Season 4 (2017)
Note: Episodes 1, 3, and 5 are officially recognized by A&E as episodes of Season 4, though they follow the New Orleans crew instead of the Tampa crew, and are promoted by some unofficial sources as part of Season 3.

Season 5 (2021)
Season 5 also includes the one-hour specials "Return to the Big Easy", which aired on March 18, 2021, and "City of Saints", which aired on April 29, 2021.

Season 6 (2022)

Release
In 2021, the series was released on the streaming service Discovery+. Season 1 was also released on Hulu.

Reception
Nightwatch was given a rating of 3/5 stars by Common Sense Media. The series has been widely praised by emergency service people and organizations for its authenticity.

The series has been the subject of controversy with regards to patient privacy. There have also been concerns about the cities featured in the show being portrayed negatively.

Related series
The series was followed by Nightwatch Nation, a one-season series with the same premise, but which focuses on a different city in each episode, and only focuses on emergency medical technicians (whereas the main series focuses on police and firefighters as well). Nightwatch Nation aired in between seasons 4 and 5 of Nightwatch, and is sometimes promoted as a season of the main series.

References

External links
 
 

2010s American reality television series
2020s American reality television series
A&E (TV network) original programming
2015 American television series debuts
Television shows filmed in New Orleans